Webster School may refer to:
(sorted by state, then city/town)

Webster School (Waterbury, Connecticut), listed on the National Register of Historic Places (NRHP) in New Haven County, Connecticut
Webster Grammar School, Auburn, Maine, listed on the NRHP in Androscoggin County, Maine
Elmer R. Webster School, Pontiac, Michigan
Webster School (Kansas City, Missouri), listed on the NRHP in Jackson County, Missouri
Webster School (Magna, Utah), listed on the NRHP in Salt Lake County, Utah